The Massachusetts Institute of Technology (MIT) is a private land-grant research university in Cambridge, Massachusetts. Established in 1861, MIT has played a key role in the development of modern technology and science.

Founded in response to the increasing industrialization of the United States, MIT adopted a European polytechnic university model and stressed laboratory instruction in applied science and engineering. MIT is one of three private land grant universities in the United States, the others being Cornell University and Tuskegee University. The institute has an urban campus that extends more than a mile (1.6 km) alongside the Charles River, and encompasses a number of major off-campus facilities such as the MIT Lincoln Laboratory, the Bates Center, and the Haystack Observatory, as well as affiliated laboratories such as the Broad and Whitehead Institutes.

, 100 Nobel laureates, 26 Turing Award winners, and 8 Fields Medalists have been affiliated with MIT as alumni, faculty members, or researchers. In addition, 58 National Medal of Science recipients, 29 National Medals of Technology and Innovation recipients, 50 MacArthur Fellows, 83 Marshall Scholars, 41 astronauts, 16 Chief Scientists of the US Air Force, and numerous heads of states have been affiliated with MIT. The institute also has a strong entrepreneurial culture and MIT alumni have founded or co-founded many notable companies. MIT is a member of the Association of American Universities (AAU) and has received more Sloan Research Fellowships and Hertz Fellowships than any other university.

History

Foundation and vision 

In 1859, a proposal was submitted to the Massachusetts General Court to use newly filled lands in Back Bay, Boston for a "Conservatory of Art and Science", but the proposal failed. A charter for the incorporation of the Massachusetts Institute of Technology, proposed by William Barton Rogers, was signed by John Albion Andrew, the governor of Massachusetts, on April 10, 1861.

Rogers, a graduate of William and Mary and professor at UVA, wanted to establish an institution to address rapid scientific and technological advances. He did not wish to found a professional school, but a combination with elements of both professional and liberal education, proposing that:
The true and only practicable object of a polytechnic school is, as I conceive, the teaching, not of the minute details and manipulations of the arts, which can be done only in the workshop, but the inculcation of those scientific principles which form the basis and explanation of them, and along with this, a full and methodical review of all their leading processes and operations in connection with physical laws.

The Rogers Plan reflected the German research university model, emphasizing an independent faculty engaged in research, as well as instruction oriented around seminars and laboratories.

Early developments 

Two days after MIT was chartered, the first battle of the Civil War broke out. After a long delay through the war years, MIT's first classes were held in the Mercantile Building in Boston in 1865. The new institute was founded as part of the Morrill Land-Grant Colleges Act to fund institutions "to promote the liberal and practical education of the industrial classes" and was a land-grant school. In 1863 under the same act, the Commonwealth of Massachusetts founded the Massachusetts Agricultural College, which developed as the University of Massachusetts Amherst. In 1866, the proceeds from land sales went toward new buildings in the Back Bay.

MIT was informally called "Boston Tech". The institute adopted the European polytechnic university model and emphasized laboratory instruction from an early date. Despite chronic financial problems, the institute saw growth in the last two decades of the 19th century under President Francis Amasa Walker. Programs in electrical, chemical, marine, and sanitary engineering were introduced, new buildings were built, and the size of the student body increased to more than one thousand.

The curriculum drifted to a vocational emphasis, with less focus on theoretical science. The fledgling school still suffered from chronic financial shortages which diverted the attention of the MIT leadership. During these "Boston Tech" years, MIT faculty and alumni rebuffed Harvard University president (and former MIT faculty) Charles W. Eliot's repeated attempts to merge MIT with Harvard College's Lawrence Scientific School. There would be at least six attempts to absorb MIT into Harvard. In its cramped Back Bay location, MIT could not afford to expand its overcrowded facilities, driving a desperate search for a new campus and funding. Eventually, the MIT Corporation approved a formal agreement to merge with Harvard, over the vehement objections of MIT faculty, students, and alumni. However, a 1917 decision by the Massachusetts Supreme Judicial Court effectively put an end to the merger scheme.

In 1916, the MIT administration and the MIT charter crossed the Charles River on the ceremonial barge Bucentaur built for the occasion, to signify MIT's move to a spacious new campus largely consisting of filled land on a  tract along the Cambridge side of the Charles River. The neoclassical "New Technology" campus was designed by William W. Bosworth and had been funded largely by anonymous donations from a mysterious "Mr. Smith", starting in 1912. In January 1920, the donor was revealed to be the industrialist George Eastman of Rochester, New York, who had invented methods of film production and processing, and founded Eastman Kodak. Between 1912 and 1920, Eastman donated $20 million ($ million in 2015 dollars) in cash and Kodak stock to MIT.

Curricular reforms 
In the 1930s, President Karl Taylor Compton and Vice-President (effectively Provost) Vannevar Bush emphasized the importance of pure sciences like physics and chemistry and reduced the vocational practice required in shops and drafting studios. The Compton reforms "renewed confidence in the ability of the Institute to develop leadership in science as well as in engineering". Unlike Ivy League schools, MIT catered more to middle-class families, and depended more on tuition than on endowments or grants for its funding. The school was elected to the Association of American Universities in 1934.

Still, as late as 1949, the Lewis Committee lamented in its report on the state of education at MIT that "the Institute is widely conceived as basically a vocational school", a "partly unjustified" perception the committee sought to change. The report comprehensively reviewed the undergraduate curriculum, recommended offering a broader education, and warned against letting engineering and government-sponsored research detract from the sciences and humanities. The School of Humanities, Arts, and Social Sciences and the MIT Sloan School of Management were formed in 1950 to compete with the powerful Schools of Science and Engineering. Previously marginalized faculties in the areas of economics, management, political science, and linguistics emerged into cohesive and assertive departments by attracting respected professors and launching competitive graduate programs. The School of Humanities, Arts, and Social Sciences continued to develop under the successive terms of the more humanistically oriented presidents Howard W. Johnson and Jerome Wiesner between 1966 and 1980.

Defense research 

MIT's involvement in military science surged during World War II. In 1941, Vannevar Bush was appointed head of the federal Office of Scientific Research and Development and directed funding to only a select group of universities, including MIT. Engineers and scientists from across the country gathered at MIT's Radiation Laboratory, established in 1940 to assist the British military in developing microwave radar. The work done there significantly affected both the war and subsequent research in the area. Other defense projects included gyroscope-based and other complex control systems for gunsight, bombsight, and inertial navigation under Charles Stark Draper's Instrumentation Laboratory; the development of a digital computer for flight simulations under Project Whirlwind; and high-speed and high-altitude photography under Harold Edgerton. By the end of the war, MIT became the nation's largest wartime R&D contractor (attracting some criticism of Bush), employing nearly 4000 in the Radiation Laboratory alone and receiving in excess of $100 million ($ billion in 2015 dollars) before 1946. Work on defense projects continued even after then. Post-war government-sponsored research at MIT included SAGE and guidance systems for ballistic missiles and Project Apollo.

These activities affected MIT profoundly. A 1949 report noted the lack of "any great slackening in the pace of life at the Institute" to match the return to peacetime, remembering the "academic tranquility of the prewar years", though acknowledging the significant contributions of military research to the increased emphasis on graduate education and rapid growth of personnel and facilities. The faculty doubled and the graduate student body quintupled during the terms of Karl Taylor Compton, president of MIT between 1930 and 1948; James Rhyne Killian, president from 1948 to 1957; and Julius Adams Stratton, chancellor from 1952 to 1957, whose institution-building strategies shaped the expanding university. By the 1950s, MIT no longer simply benefited the industries with which it had worked for three decades, and it had developed closer working relationships with new patrons, philanthropic foundations and the federal government.

In late 1960s and early 1970s, student and faculty activists protested against the Vietnam War and MIT's defense research. In this period MIT's various departments were researching helicopters, smart bombs and counterinsurgency techniques for the war in Vietnam as well as guidance systems for nuclear missiles. The Union of Concerned Scientists was founded on March 4, 1969 during a meeting of faculty members and students seeking to shift the emphasis on military research toward environmental and social problems. MIT ultimately divested itself from the Instrumentation Laboratory and moved all classified research off-campus to the MIT Lincoln Laboratory facility in 1973 in response to the protests. The student body, faculty, and administration remained comparatively unpolarized during what was a tumultuous time for many other universities. Johnson was seen to be highly successful in leading his institution to "greater strength and unity" after these times of turmoil. However six MIT students were sentenced to prison terms at this time and some former student leaders, such as Michael Albert and George Katsiaficas, are still indignant about MIT's role in military research and its suppression of these protests. (Richard Leacock's film, November Actions, records some of these tumultuous events.)

In the 1980s, there was more controversy at MIT over its involvement in SDI (space weaponry) and CBW (chemical and biological warfare) research. More recently, MIT's research for the military has included work on robots, drones and 'battle suits'.

Recent history 

MIT has kept pace with and helped to advance the digital age. In addition to developing the predecessors to modern computing and networking technologies, students, staff, and faculty members at Project MAC, the Artificial Intelligence Laboratory, and the Tech Model Railroad Club wrote some of the earliest interactive computer video games like Spacewar! and created much of modern hacker slang and culture. Several major computer-related organizations have originated at MIT since the 1980s: Richard Stallman's GNU Project and the subsequent Free Software Foundation were founded in the mid-1980s at the AI Lab; the MIT Media Lab was founded in 1985 by Nicholas Negroponte and Jerome Wiesner to promote research into novel uses of computer technology; the World Wide Web Consortium standards organization was founded at the Laboratory for Computer Science in 1994 by Tim Berners-Lee; the OpenCourseWare project has made course materials for over 2,000 MIT classes available online free of charge since 2002; and the One Laptop per Child initiative to expand computer education and connectivity to children worldwide was launched in 2005.

MIT was named a sea-grant college in 1976 to support its programs in oceanography and marine sciences and was named a space-grant college in 1989 to support its aeronautics and astronautics programs. Despite diminishing government financial support over the past quarter century, MIT launched several successful development campaigns to significantly expand the campus: new dormitories and athletics buildings on west campus; the Tang Center for Management Education; several buildings in the northeast corner of campus supporting research into biology, brain and cognitive sciences, genomics, biotechnology, and cancer research; and a number of new "backlot" buildings on Vassar Street including the Stata Center. Construction on campus in the 2000s included expansions of the Media Lab, the Sloan School's eastern campus, and graduate residences in the northwest. In 2006, President Hockfield launched the MIT Energy Research Council to investigate the interdisciplinary challenges posed by increasing global energy consumption.

In 2001, inspired by the open source and open access movements, MIT launched OpenCourseWare to make the lecture notes, problem sets, syllabi, exams, and lectures from the great majority of its courses available online for no charge, though without any formal accreditation for coursework completed. While the cost of supporting and hosting the project is high, OCW expanded in 2005 to include other universities as a part of the OpenCourseWare Consortium, which currently includes more than 250 academic institutions with content available in at least six languages. In 2011, MIT announced it would offer formal certification (but not credits or degrees) to online participants completing coursework in its "MITx" program, for a modest fee. The "edX" online platform supporting MITx was initially developed in partnership with Harvard and its analogous "Harvardx" initiative. The courseware platform is open source, and other universities have already joined and added their own course content. In March 2009 the MIT faculty adopted an open-access policy to make its scholarship publicly accessible online.

MIT has its own police force. Three days after the Boston Marathon bombing of April 2013, MIT Police patrol officer Sean Collier was fatally shot by the suspects Dzhokhar and Tamerlan Tsarnaev, setting off a violent manhunt that shut down the campus and much of the Boston metropolitan area for a day. One week later, Collier's memorial service was attended by more than 10,000 people, in a ceremony hosted by the MIT community with thousands of police officers from the New England region and Canada. On November 25, 2013, MIT announced the creation of the Collier Medal, to be awarded annually to "an individual or group that embodies the character and qualities that Officer Collier exhibited as a member of the MIT community and in all aspects of his life". The announcement further stated that "Future recipients of the award will include those whose contributions exceed the boundaries of their profession, those who have contributed to building bridges across the community, and those who consistently and selflessly perform acts of kindness".

In September 2017, the school announced the creation of an artificial intelligence research lab called the MIT-IBM Watson AI Lab. IBM will spend $240 million over the next decade, and the lab will be staffed by MIT and IBM scientists. In October 2018 MIT announced that it would open a new Schwarzman College of Computing dedicated to the study of artificial intelligence, named after lead donor and The Blackstone Group CEO Stephen Schwarzman. The focus of the new college is to study not just AI, but interdisciplinary AI education, and how AI can be used in fields as diverse as history and biology. The cost of buildings and new faculty for the new college is expected to be $1 billion upon completion.

The Laser Interferometer Gravitational-Wave Observatory (LIGO) was designed and constructed by a team of scientists from California Institute of Technology, MIT, and industrial contractors, and funded by the National Science Foundation. It was designed to open the field of gravitational-wave astronomy through the detection of gravitational waves predicted by general relativity. Gravitational waves were detected for the first time by the LIGO detector in 2015. For contributions to the LIGO detector and the observation of gravitational waves, two Caltech physicists, Kip Thorne and Barry Barish, and MIT physicist Rainer Weiss won the Nobel Prize in physics in 2017. Weiss, who is also an MIT graduate, designed the laser interferometric technique, which served as the essential blueprint for the LIGO.

Campus 

MIT's  campus in the city of Cambridge spans approximately a mile along the north side of the Charles River basin. The campus is divided roughly in half by Massachusetts Avenue, with most dormitories and student life facilities to the west and most academic buildings to the east. The bridge closest to MIT is the Harvard Bridge, which is known for being marked off in a non-standard unit of length – the smoot.

The Kendall/MIT MBTA Red Line station is located on the northeastern edge of the campus, in Kendall Square. The Cambridge neighborhoods surrounding MIT are a mixture of high tech companies occupying both modern office and rehabilitated industrial buildings, as well as socio-economically diverse residential neighborhoods. In early 2016, MIT presented its updated Kendall Square Initiative to the City of Cambridge, with plans for mixed-use educational, retail, residential, startup incubator, and office space in a dense high-rise transit-oriented development plan. The MIT Museum has moved moved immediately adjacent to a Kendall Square subway entrance, joining the List Visual Arts Center on the eastern end of the campus.

Each building at MIT has a number (possibly preceded by a W, N, E, or NW) designation, and most have a name as well. Typically, academic and office buildings are referred to primarily by number while residence halls are referred to by name. The organization of building numbers roughly corresponds to the order in which the buildings were built and their location relative (north, west, and east) to the original center cluster of Maclaurin buildings. Many of the buildings are connected above ground as well as through an extensive network of tunnels, providing protection from the Cambridge weather as well as a venue for roof and tunnel hacking.

MIT's on-campus nuclear reactor is one of the most powerful university-based nuclear reactors in the United States. The prominence of the reactor's containment building in a densely populated area has been controversial, but MIT maintains that it is well-secured. In 1999 Bill Gates donated US$20 million to MIT for the construction of a computer laboratory named the "William H. Gates Building", and designed by architect Frank Gehry. While Microsoft had previously given financial support to the institution, this was the first personal donation received from Gates.

MIT Nano, also known as Building 12, is an interdisciplinary facility for nanoscale research. Its  cleanroom and research space, visible through expansive glass facades, is the largest research facility of its kind in the nation. With a cost of US$400 million, it is also one of the costliest buildings on campus. The facility also provides state-of-the-art nanoimaging capabilities with vibration damped imaging and metrology suites sitting atop a  slab of concrete underground.

Other notable campus facilities include a pressurized wind tunnel for testing aerodynamic research, a towing tank for testing ship and ocean structure designs, and previously Alcator C-Mod, which was the largest fusion device operated by any university. MIT's campus-wide wireless network was completed in the fall of 2005 and consists of nearly 3,000 access points covering  of campus.

In 2001, the Environmental Protection Agency sued MIT for violating the Clean Water Act and the Clean Air Act with regard to its hazardous waste storage and disposal procedures. MIT settled the suit by paying a $155,000 fine and launching three environmental projects. In connection with capital campaigns to expand the campus, the Institute has also extensively renovated existing buildings to improve their energy efficiency. MIT has also taken steps to reduce its environmental impact by running alternative fuel campus shuttles, subsidizing public transportation passes, and building a low-emission cogeneration plant that serves most of the campus electricity, heating, and cooling requirements.

MIT has substantial commercial real estate holdings in Cambridge on which it pays property taxes, plus an additional voluntary payment in lieu of taxes (PILOT) on academic buildings which are legally tax-exempt. , it is the largest taxpayer in the city, contributing approximately 14% of the city's annual revenues. Holdings include Technology Square, parts of Kendall Square, and many properties in Cambridgeport and Area 4 neighboring the educational buildings. The land is held for investment purposes and potential long-term expansion.

Architecture 

MIT's School of Architecture, now the School of Architecture and Planning, was the first formal architecture program in the United States, and it has a history of commissioning progressive buildings. The first buildings constructed on the Cambridge campus, completed in 1916, are sometimes called the "Maclaurin buildings" after Institute president Richard Maclaurin who oversaw their construction. Designed by William Welles Bosworth, these imposing buildings were built of reinforced concrete, a first for a non-industrial – much less university – building in the US. Bosworth's design was influenced by the City Beautiful Movement of the early 1900s and features the Pantheon-esque Great Dome housing the Barker Engineering Library. The Great Dome overlooks Killian Court, where graduation ceremonies are held each year. The friezes of the limestone-clad buildings around Killian Court are engraved with the names of important scientists and philosophers. The spacious Building 7 atrium at 77 Massachusetts Avenue is regarded as the entrance to the Infinite Corridor and the rest of the campus.

Alvar Aalto's Baker House (1947), Eero Saarinen's MIT Chapel and Kresge Auditorium (1955), and I.M. Pei's Green, Dreyfus, Landau, and Wiesner buildings represent high forms of post-war modernist architecture. More recent buildings like Frank Gehry's Stata Center (2004), Steven Holl's Simmons Hall (2002), Charles Correa's Building 46 (2005), and Fumihiko Maki's Media Lab Extension (2009) stand out among the Boston area's classical architecture and serve as examples of contemporary campus "starchitecture". These buildings have not always been well received; in 2010, The Princeton Review included MIT in a list of twenty schools whose campuses are "tiny, unsightly, or both".

Housing 

Undergraduates are guaranteed four-year housing in one of MIT's 11 undergraduate dormitories. Those living on campus can receive support and mentoring from live-in graduate student tutors, resident advisors, and faculty housemasters. Because housing assignments are made based on the preferences of the students themselves, diverse social atmospheres can be sustained in different living groups; for example, according to the Yale Daily News staff's The Insider's Guide to the Colleges, 2010, "The split between East Campus and West Campus is a significant characteristic of MIT. East Campus has gained a reputation as a thriving counterculture." MIT also has 5 dormitories for single graduate students and 2 apartment buildings on campus for married student families.

MIT has an active Greek and co-op housing system, including thirty-six fraternities, sororities, and independent living groups (FSILGs). , 98% of all undergraduates lived in MIT-affiliated housing; 54% of the men participated in fraternities and 20% of the women were involved in sororities. Most FSILGs are located across the river in Back Bay near where MIT was founded, and there is also a cluster of fraternities on MIT's West Campus that face the Charles River Basin. After the 1997 alcohol-related death of Scott Krueger, a new pledge at the Phi Gamma Delta fraternity, MIT required all freshmen to live in the dormitory system starting in 2002. Because FSILGs had previously housed as many as 300 freshmen off-campus, the new policy could not be implemented until Simmons Hall opened in that year.

In 2013–2014, MIT abruptly closed and then demolished undergrad dorm Bexley Hall, citing extensive water damage that made repairs infeasible. In 2017, MIT shut down Senior House after a century of service as an undergrad dorm. That year, MIT administrators released data showing just 60% of Senior House residents had graduated in four years. Campus-wide, the four-year graduation rate is 84% (the cumulative graduation rate is significantly higher).

Organization and administration 

MIT is chartered as a non-profit organization and is owned and governed by a privately appointed board of trustees known as the MIT Corporation. The current board consists of 43 members elected to five-year terms, 25 life members who vote until their 75th birthday, 3 elected officers (President, Treasurer, and Secretary), and 4 ex officio members (the president of the alumni association, the Governor of Massachusetts, the Massachusetts Secretary of Education, and the Chief Justice of the Massachusetts Supreme Judicial Court). The board is chaired by Diane Greene SM ’78, co-founder and former CEO of VMware and former CEO of Google Cloud. The Corporation approves the budget, new programs, degrees and faculty appointments, and elects the President to serve as the chief executive officer of the university and preside over the Institute's faculty. MIT's endowment and other financial assets are managed through a subsidiary called MIT Investment Management Company (MITIMCo). Valued at $16.4 billion in 2018, MIT's endowment was then the sixth-largest among American colleges and universities.

MIT has five schools (Science, Engineering, Architecture and Planning, Management, and Humanities, Arts, and Social Sciences) and one college (Schwarzman College of Computing), but no schools of law or medicine. While faculty committees assert substantial control over many areas of MIT's curriculum, research, student life, and administrative affairs, the chair of each of MIT's 32 academic departments reports to the dean of that department's school, who in turn reports to the Provost under the President. The current president is Sally Kornbluth, a cell biologist and former provost at Duke University. She became MIT's 18th president in January 2023. She was preceded by L. Rafael Reif, who had served as provost under President Susan Hockfield, the first woman to hold the post.

Academics 
MIT is a large, highly residential, research university with a majority of enrollments in graduate and professional programs. The university has been accredited by the New England Association of Schools and Colleges since 1929. MIT operates on a 4–1–4 academic calendar with the fall semester beginning after Labor Day and ending in mid-December, a 4-week "Independent Activities Period" in the month of January, and the spring semester commencing in early February and ceasing in late May.

MIT students refer to both their majors and classes using numbers or acronyms alone. Students majoring in Electrical Engineering and Computer Science (EECS), the most popular department, collectively identify themselves as "Course 6". MIT students use a combination of the department's course number and the number assigned to the class to identify their subjects; for instance, the introductory calculus-based classical mechanics course is simply "8.01" (pronounced eight-oh-one) at MIT.

Undergraduate program 

The four-year, full-time undergraduate program maintains a balance between professional majors and those in the arts and sciences. In 2010, it was dubbed "most selective" by U.S. News, admitting few transfer students and 4.1% of its applicants in the 2020–2021 admissions cycle. MIT offers 44 undergraduate degrees across its five schools. In the 2017–2018 academic year, 1,045 Bachelor of Science degrees (abbreviated "SB") were granted, the only type of undergraduate degree MIT now awards. In the 2011 fall term, among students who had designated a major, the School of Engineering was the most popular division, enrolling 63% of students in its 19 degree programs, followed by the School of Science (29%), School of Humanities, Arts, & Social Sciences (3.7%), Sloan School of Management (3.3%), and School of Architecture and Planning (2%). The largest undergraduate degree programs were in Electrical Engineering and Computer Science, Computer Science and Engineering, Mechanical Engineering, Physics, and Mathematics.

All undergraduates are required to complete a core curriculum called the General Institute Requirements (GIRs). The Science Requirement, generally completed during freshman year as prerequisites for classes in science and engineering majors, comprises two semesters of physics, two semesters of calculus, one semester of chemistry, and one semester of biology. There is a Laboratory Requirement, usually satisfied by an appropriate class in a course major. The Humanities, Arts, and Social Sciences (HASS) Requirement consists of eight semesters of classes in the humanities, arts, and social sciences, including at least one semester from each division as well as the courses required for a designated concentration in a HASS division. Under the Communication Requirement, two of the HASS classes, plus two of the classes taken in the designated major must be "communication-intensive", including "substantial instruction and practice in oral presentation". Finally, all students are required to complete a swimming test; non-varsity athletes must also take four quarters of physical education classes.

Most classes rely on a combination of lectures, recitations led by associate professors or graduate students, weekly problem sets ("p-sets"), and periodic quizzes or tests. While the pace and difficulty of MIT coursework has been compared to "drinking from a fire hose", the freshmen retention rate at MIT is similar to other research universities. The "pass/no-record" grading system relieves some pressure for first-year undergraduates. For each class taken in the fall term, freshmen transcripts will either report only that the class was passed, or otherwise not have any record of it. In the spring term, passing grades (A, B, C) appear on the transcript while non-passing grades are again not recorded. (Grading had previously been "pass/no record" all freshman year, but was amended for the Class of 2006 to prevent students from gaming the system by completing required major classes in their freshman year.) Also, freshmen may choose to join alternative learning communities, such as Experimental Study Group, Concourse, or Terrascope.

In 1969, Margaret MacVicar founded the Undergraduate Research Opportunities Program (UROP) to enable undergraduates to collaborate directly with faculty members and researchers. Students join or initiate research projects ("UROPs") for academic credit, pay, or on a volunteer basis through postings on the UROP website or by contacting faculty members directly. A substantial majority of undergraduates participate. Students often become published, file patent applications, and/or launch start-up companies based upon their experience in UROPs.

In 1970, the then-Dean of Institute Relations, Benson R. Snyder, published The Hidden Curriculum, arguing that education at MIT was often slighted in favor of following a set of unwritten expectations and that graduating with good grades was more often the product of figuring out the system rather than a solid education. The successful student, according to Snyder, was the one who was able to discern which of the formal requirements were to be ignored in favor of which unstated norms. For example, organized student groups had compiled "course bibles"—collections of problem-set and examination questions and answers for later students to use as references. This sort of gamesmanship, Snyder argued, hindered development of a creative intellect and contributed to student discontent and unrest.

Graduate program 
MIT's graduate program has high coexistence with the undergraduate program, and many courses are taken by qualified students at both levels. MIT offers a comprehensive doctoral program with degrees in the humanities, social sciences, and STEM fields as well as professional degrees, including the Master of Business Administration (MBA). The Institute offers graduate programs leading to academic degrees such as the Master of Science (which is abbreviated as MS at MIT), various Engineer's Degrees, Doctor of Philosophy (PhD), and Doctor of Science (DSc) and interdisciplinary graduate programs such as the MD-PhD (with Harvard Medical School) and a joint program in oceanography with Woods Hole Oceanographic Institution.

Admission to graduate programs is decentralized; applicants apply directly to the department or degree program. More than 90% of doctoral students are supported by fellowships, research assistantships (RAs), or teaching assistantships (TAs).

MIT Bootcamps 
MIT Bootcamps are intense week-long innovation and leadership programs that challenge participants to develop a venture in a week. Each Bootcamp centers around a particular topic, specific to an industry, leadership skill set, or emerging technology. Cohorts are organized into small teams who work on an entrepreneurial project together, in addition to individual learning and team coaching. The program includes a series of online seminars with MIT faculty, practitioners, and industry experts, innovation workshops with bootcamp instructors focused on putting the theory participants have learned into practice, coaching sessions, and informal office hours for learners to exchange ideas freely. Bootcampers are tasked with weekly "deliverables," which are key elements of a business plan, to help guide the group through the decision-making process involved in building an enterprise. The experience culminates in a final pitch session, judged by a panel of experts.

MIT Bootcamp instructors include Eric von Hippel, Sanjay Sarma, Erdin Beshimov, and Bill Aulet. MIT Bootcamps were founded by Erdin Beshimov.

Rankings 

MIT places among the top five in many overall rankings of universities (see table right) and rankings based on students' revealed preferences. For several years, U.S. News & World Report, the QS World University Rankings, and the Academic Ranking of World Universities have ranked MIT's School of Engineering first, as did the 1995 National Research Council report. In the same lists, MIT's strongest showings apart from in engineering are in computer science, the natural sciences, business, architecture, economics, linguistics, mathematics, and, to a lesser extent, political science and philosophy.

Times Higher Education has recognized MIT as one of the world's "six super brands" on its World Reputation Rankings, along with Berkeley, Cambridge, Harvard, Oxford, and Stanford. In 2019, it was ranked #3 among the universities around the world by SCImago Institutions Rankings. In 2017, the Times Higher Education World University Rankings also rated MIT the #2 university for arts and humanities. MIT was ranked #7 in 2015 and #6 in 2017 of the Nature Index Annual Tables, which measure the largest contributors to papers published in 82 leading journals. Georgetown University researchers ranked MIT #3 in the US for 20-year return on investment.

Collaborations 

The university historically pioneered research and training collaborations between academia, industry and government.  In 1946, President Compton, Harvard Business School professor Georges Doriot, and Massachusetts Investor Trust chairman Merrill Grisswold founded American Research and Development Corporation, the first American venture-capital firm.  In 1948, Compton established the MIT Industrial Liaison Program. Throughout the late 1980s and early 1990s, American politicians and business leaders accused MIT and other universities of contributing to a declining economy by transferring taxpayer-funded research and technology to international – especially Japanese – firms that were competing with struggling American businesses. On the other hand, MIT's extensive collaboration with the federal government on research projects has led to several MIT leaders serving as presidential scientific advisers since 1940. MIT established a Washington Office in 1991 to continue effective lobbying for research funding and national science policy.

The US Justice Department began an investigation in 1989, and in 1991 filed an antitrust suit against MIT, the eight Ivy League colleges, and eleven other institutions for allegedly engaging in price-fixing during their annual "Overlap Meetings", which were held to prevent bidding wars over promising prospective students from consuming funds for need-based scholarships. While the Ivy League institutions settled, MIT contested the charges, arguing that the practice was not anti-competitive because it ensured the availability of aid for the greatest number of students. MIT ultimately prevailed when the Justice Department dropped the case in 1994.

MIT's proximity to Harvard University ("the other school up the river") has led to a substantial number of research collaborations such as the Harvard-MIT Division of Health Sciences and Technology and the Broad Institute. In addition, students at the two schools can cross-register for credits toward their own school's degrees without any additional fees. A cross-registration program between MIT and Wellesley College has also existed since 1969, and in 2002 the Cambridge–MIT Institute launched an undergraduate exchange program between MIT and the University of Cambridge. MIT also has a long-term partnership with Imperial College London, for both student exchanges and research collaboration. More modest cross-registration programs have been established with Boston University, Brandeis University, Tufts University, Massachusetts College of Art, and the School of the Museum of Fine Arts, Boston.

MIT maintains substantial research and faculty ties with independent research organizations in the Boston area, such as the Charles Stark Draper Laboratory, the Whitehead Institute for Biomedical Research, and the Woods Hole Oceanographic Institution. Ongoing international research and educational collaborations include the Amsterdam Institute for Advanced Metropolitan Solutions (AMS Institute), Singapore-MIT Alliance, MIT-Politecnico di Milano, MIT-Zaragoza International Logistics Program, and projects in other countries through the MIT International Science and Technology Initiatives (MISTI) program.

The mass-market magazine Technology Review is published by MIT through a subsidiary company, as is a special edition that also serves as an alumni magazine. The MIT Press is a major university press, publishing over 200 books and 30 journals annually, emphasizing science and technology as well as arts, architecture, new media, current events, and social issues.

MIT Microphotonics Center and PhotonDelta founded the global roadmap for integrated photonics: Integrated Photonics Systems Roadmap – International (IPSR-I). The first edition has been published in 2020. The roadmap is an amalgamation of two previously independent roadmaps: the IPSR roadmap of MIT Microphotonics Center and AIM Photonics in the United States, and the WTMF (World Technology Mapping Forum) of PhotonDelta in Europe.

Libraries, collections, and museums 

The MIT library system consists of five subject libraries: Barker (Engineering), Dewey (Economics), Hayden (Humanities and Science), Lewis (Music), and Rotch (Arts and Architecture). There are also various specialized libraries and archives. The libraries contain more than 2.9 million printed volumes, 2.4 million microforms, 49,000 print or electronic journal subscriptions, and 670 reference databases. The past decade has seen a trend of increased focus on digital over print resources in the libraries. Notable collections include the Lewis Music Library with an emphasis on 20th and 21st-century music and electronic music, the List Visual Arts Center's rotating exhibitions of contemporary art, and the Compton Gallery's cross-disciplinary exhibitions. MIT allocates a percentage of the budget for all new construction and renovation to commission and support its extensive public art and outdoor sculpture collection.

The MIT Museum was founded in 1971 and collects, preserves, and exhibits artifacts significant to the culture and history of MIT. The museum now engages in significant educational outreach programs for the general public, including the annual Cambridge Science Festival, the first celebration of this kind in the United States. Since 2005, its official mission has been, "to engage the wider community with MIT's science, technology and other areas of scholarship in ways that will best serve the nation and the world in the 21st century".

Research 
MIT was elected to the Association of American Universities in 1934 and is classified among "R1: Doctoral Universities – Very high research activity"; research expenditures totaled $952 million in 2017. The federal government was the largest source of sponsored research, with the Department of Health and Human Services granting $255.9 million, Department of Defense $97.5 million, Department of Energy $65.8 million, National Science Foundation $61.4 million, and NASA $27.4 million. MIT employs approximately 1300 researchers in addition to faculty. In 2011, MIT faculty and researchers disclosed 632 inventions, were issued 153 patents, earned $85.4 million in cash income, and received $69.6 million in royalties. Through programs like the Deshpande Center, MIT faculty leverage their research and discoveries into multi-million-dollar commercial ventures.

In electronics, magnetic-core memory, radar, single-electron transistors, and inertial guidance controls were invented or substantially developed by MIT researchers. Harold Eugene Edgerton was a pioneer in high-speed photography and sonar. Claude E. Shannon developed much of modern information theory and discovered the application of Boolean logic to digital circuit design theory. In the domain of computer science, MIT faculty and researchers made fundamental contributions to cybernetics, artificial intelligence, computer languages, machine learning, robotics, and cryptography. At least nine Turing Award laureates and seven recipients of the Draper Prize in engineering have been or are currently associated with MIT.

Current and previous physics faculty have won eight Nobel Prizes, four Dirac Medals, and three Wolf Prizes predominantly for their contributions to subatomic and quantum theory. Members of the chemistry department have been awarded three Nobel Prizes and one Wolf Prize for the discovery of novel syntheses and methods. MIT biologists have been awarded six Nobel Prizes for their contributions to genetics, immunology, oncology, and molecular biology. Professor Eric Lander was one of the principal leaders of the Human Genome Project. Positronium atoms, synthetic penicillin, synthetic self-replicating molecules, and the genetic bases for Amyotrophic lateral sclerosis (also known as ALS or Lou Gehrig's disease) and Huntington's disease were first discovered at MIT. Jerome Lettvin transformed the study of cognitive science with his paper "What the frog's eye tells the frog's brain". Researchers developed a system to convert MRI scans into 3D printed physical models.

In the domain of humanities, arts, and social sciences, as of October 2019 MIT economists have been awarded seven Nobel Prizes and nine John Bates Clark Medals. Linguists Noam Chomsky and Morris Halle authored seminal texts on generative grammar and phonology. The MIT Media Lab, founded in 1985 within the School of Architecture and Planning and known for its unconventional research, has been home to influential researchers such as constructivist educator and Logo creator Seymour Papert.

Spanning many of the above fields, MacArthur Fellowships (the so-called "Genius Grants") have been awarded to 50 people associated with MIT. Five Pulitzer Prize–winning writers currently work at or have retired from MIT. Four current or former faculty are members of the American Academy of Arts and Letters.

Allegations of research misconduct or improprieties have received substantial press coverage. Professor David Baltimore, a Nobel Laureate, became embroiled in a misconduct investigation starting in 1986 that led to Congressional hearings in 1991. Professor Ted Postol has accused the MIT administration since 2000 of attempting to whitewash potential research misconduct at the Lincoln Lab facility involving a ballistic missile defense test, though a final investigation into the matter has not been completed. Associate Professor Luk Van Parijs was dismissed in 2005 following allegations of scientific misconduct and found guilty of the same by the United States Office of Research Integrity in 2009.

In 2019, Clarivate Analytics named 54 members of MIT's faculty to its list of "Highly Cited Researchers". That number places MIT eighth among the world's universities.

Discoveries and innovation

Natural sciences 
Oncogene – Robert Weinberg discovered genetic basis of human cancer.
Reverse transcription – David Baltimore independently isolated, in 1970 at MIT, two RNA tumor viruses: R-MLV and again RSV.
Thermal death time – Samuel Cate Prescott and William Lyman Underwood from 1895 to 1898. Done for canning of food. Applications later found useful in medical devices, pharmaceuticals, and cosmetics.

Computer and applied sciences 
Akamai Technologies – Daniel Lewin and Tom Leighton developed a faster content delivery network, now one of the world's largest distributed computing platforms, responsible for serving between 15 and 30 percent of all web traffic.
Cryptography – MIT researchers Ron Rivest, Adi Shamir and Leonard Adleman developed one of the first practical public-key cryptosystems, the RSA cryptosystem, and started a company, RSA Security.
Digital circuits – Claude Shannon, while a master's degree student at MIT, developed the digital circuit design theory which paved the way for modern computers.
Electronic ink – developed by Joseph Jacobson at MIT Media Lab.
Emacs (text editor) – development began during the 1970s at the MIT AI Lab.
Flight recorder (black box) – Charles Stark Draper developed the black box at MIT's Instrumentation Laboratory. That lab later made the Apollo Moon landings possible through the Apollo Guidance Computer it designed for NASA.
GNU Project – Richard Stallman formally founded the free software movement in 1983 by launching the GNU Project at MIT.
Julia (programming language) – Development was started in 2009, by Jeff Bezanson, Stefan Karpinski, Viral B. Shah, and Alan Edelman, all at MIT at that time, and continued with the contribution of a dedicated MIT Julia Lab
Lisp (programming language) – John McCarthy invented Lisp at MIT in 1958.
Lithium-ion battery efficiencies – Yet-Ming Chiang and his group at MIT showed a substantial improvement in the performance of lithium batteries by boosting the material's conductivity by doping it with aluminium, niobium and zirconium.
Macsyma, one of the oldest general-purpose computer algebra systems; the GPL-licensed version Maxima remains in wide use.
MIT OpenCourseWare – the OpenCourseWare movement started in 1999 when the University of Tübingen in Germany published videos of lectures online for its timms initiative (Tübinger Internet Multimedia Server). The OCW movement only took off, however, with the launch of MIT OpenCourseWare and the Open Learning Initiative at Carnegie Mellon University in October 2002. The movement was soon reinforced by the launch of similar projects at Yale, Utah State University, the University of Michigan and the University of California Berkeley.
Perdix micro-drone – autonomous drone that uses artificial intelligence to swarm with many other Perdix drones.
Project MAC – groundbreaking research in operating systems, artificial intelligence, and the theory of computation. DARPA funded project.
Radar – developed at MIT's Radiation Laboratory during World War II.
SKETCHPAD – invented by Ivan Sutherland at MIT (presented in his PhD thesis). It pioneered the way for human–computer interaction (HCI). Sketchpad is considered to be the ancestor of modern computer-aided design (CAD) programs as well as a major breakthrough in the development of computer graphics in general.
VisiCalc – first spreadsheet computer program for personal computers, originally released for the Apple II by VisiCorp. MIT alumni Dan Bricklin and Bob Frankston rented time sharing at night on an MIT mainframe computer (that cost $1/hr for use).
World Wide Web Consortium – founded in 1994 by Tim Berners-Lee, (W3C) is the main international standards organization for the World Wide Web
X Window System – pioneering architecture-independent system for graphical user interfaces that has been widely used for Unix and Linux systems.

Companies and entrepreneurship 
MIT alumni and faculty have founded numerous companies, some of which are shown below:

Analog Devices, 1965, co-founders Ray Stata, (SB, SM) and Matthew Lorber (SB)
BlackRock, 1988, co-founder Bennett Golub, (SB, SM, PhD)
Bose Corporation, 1964, founder Amar Bose (SB, PhD)
Buzzfeed, 2006, co-founder Jonah Peretti (SM)
Dropbox, 2007, founders Drew Houston (SB) and Arash Ferdowsi (drop-out)
Hewlett-Packard, 1939, co-founder William R. Hewlett (SM)
HuffPost, 2005, co-founder Jonah Peretti (SM)
Intel, 1968, co-founder Robert Noyce (PhD)
Koch Industries, 1940, founder Fred C. Koch (SB), sons William (SB, PhD), David (SB)
Qualcomm, 1985, co-founders Irwin M. Jacobs (SM, PhD) and Andrew Viterbi (SB, SM)
Raytheon, 1922, co-founder Vannevar Bush (DEng, Professor)
Renaissance Technologies, 1982, founder James Simons (SB)
Texas Instruments, 1930, founder Cecil Howard Green (SB, SM)
TSMC, 1987, founder Morris Chang (SB, SM)
VMware, 1998, co-founder Diane Greene (SM)

Traditions and student activities 

The faculty and student body place a high value on meritocracy and on technical proficiency. MIT has never awarded an honorary degree, nor does it award athletic scholarships,  ad eundem degrees, or Latin honors upon graduation. However, MIT has twice awarded honorary professorships: to Winston Churchill in 1949 and Salman Rushdie in 1993.

Many upperclass students and alumni wear a large, heavy, distinctive class ring known as the "Brass Rat". Originally created in 1929, the ring's official name is the "Standard Technology Ring". The undergraduate ring design (a separate graduate student version exists as well) varies slightly from year to year to reflect the unique character of the MIT experience for that class, but always features a three-piece design, with the MIT seal and the class year each appearing on a separate face, flanking a large rectangular bezel bearing an image of a beaver. The initialism IHTFP, representing the informal school motto "I Hate This Fucking Place" and jocularly euphemized as "I Have Truly Found Paradise", "Institute Has The Finest Professors", "Institute of Hacks, TomFoolery and Pranks", "It's Hard to Fondle Penguins", and other variations, has occasionally been featured on the ring given its historical prominence in student culture.

Caltech Rivalry 

MIT also shares a well-known rivalry with the California Institute of Technology (Caltech), stemming from both institutions' reputations as two of the highest ranked and most highly recognized science and engineering schools in the world. The rivalry is an unusual college rivalry given its focus on academics and pranks instead of sports, and due to the geographic distance between the two (their campuses are separated by about 2970 miles and are on opposite coasts of the United States). In 2005, Caltech students pranked MIT's Campus Preview Weekend by distributing t-shirts that read "MIT" on the front, and "...because not everyone can go to Caltech" on the back. Additionally, the word Massachusetts in the "Massachusetts Institute of Technology" engraving on the exterior of the Lobby 7 dome was covered with a banner so that it read "That Other Institute of Technology." In 2006, MIT retaliated by posing as contractors and stealing the 1.7-ton, 130-year-old Fleming cannon, a Caltech landmark. The cannon was relocated to Cambridge, where it was displayed in front of the Green Building during the 2006 Campus Preview Weekend. In September 2010, MIT students unsuccessfully tried to place a life-sized model of the TARDIS time machine from the Doctor Who (1963–present) television series on top of Baxter Hall at Caltech. A few months later, Caltech students collaborated to help MIT students place the TARDIS on top of their originally planned destination. The rivalry has continued, most recently in 2014, when a group of Caltech students gave out mugs sporting the MIT logo on the front and the words "The Institute of Technology" on the back. When heated, the mugs turned orange and read, "Caltech, The Hotter Institute of Technology."

Activities 

MIT has over 500 recognized student activity groups, including a campus radio station, The Tech student newspaper, an annual entrepreneurship competition, a crime club, and weekly screenings of popular films by the Lecture Series Committee. Less traditional activities include the "world's largest open-shelf collection of science fiction" in English, a model railroad club, and a vibrant folk dance scene. Students, faculty, and staff are involved in over 50 educational outreach and public service programs through the MIT Museum, Edgerton Center, and MIT Public Service Center.

Fraternities and sororities provide a base of activities in addition to housing. Approximately 1,000 undergrads, 48% of men and 30% of women, participate in one of several dozen Greek Life men's, women's and co-ed chapters on the campus.

The Independent Activities Period is a four-week-long "term" offering hundreds of optional classes, lectures, demonstrations, and other activities throughout the month of January between the Fall and Spring semesters. Some of the most popular recurring IAP activities are Autonomous Robot Design (course 6.270), Robocraft Programming (6.370), and MasLab competitions, the annual "mystery hunt", and Charm School. More than 250 students pursue externships annually at companies in the US and abroad.

Many MIT students also engage in "hacking", which encompasses both the physical exploration of areas that are generally off-limits (such as rooftops and steam tunnels), as well as elaborate practical jokes. Examples of high-profile hacks have included the abduction of Caltech's cannon, reconstructing a Wright Flyer atop the Great Dome, and adorning the John Harvard statue with the Master Chief's Mjölnir Helmet.

Athletics 

MIT sponsors 31 varsity sports and has one of the three broadest NCAA Division III athletic programs. MIT participates in the NCAA's Division III, the New England Women's and Men's Athletic Conference, the New England Football Conference, NCAA's Division I Patriot League for women's crew, and the Collegiate Water Polo Association (CWPA) for Men's Water Polo. Men's crew competes outside the NCAA in the Eastern Association of Rowing Colleges (EARC). The intercollegiate sports teams, called the MIT Engineers won 22 Team National Championships, 42 Individual National Championships. MIT is the all-time Division III leader in producing Academic All-Americas (302) and rank second across all NCAA Divisions only behind the University of Nebraska. MIT Athletes won 13 Elite 90 awards and ranks first among NCAA Division III programs, and third among all divisions. In April 2009, budget cuts led to MIT eliminating eight of its 41 sports, including the mixed men's and women's teams in alpine skiing and pistol; separate teams for men and women in ice hockey and gymnastics; and men's programs in golf and wrestling.

People

Students 

MIT enrolled 4,602 undergraduates and 6,972 graduate students in 2018–2019. Undergraduate and graduate students came from all 50 US states as well as from 115 foreign countries.

MIT received 33,240 applications for admission to the undergraduate Class of 2025: it admitted 1,365 (4.1 percent). In 2019, 29,114 applications were received for graduate and advanced degree programs across all departments; 3,670 were admitted (12.6 percent) and 2,312 enrolled (63 percent).

Undergraduate tuition and fees for 2019–2020 was $53,790 for nine months. 59% of students were awarded a need-based MIT scholarship. Graduate tuition and fees for 2019–2020 was also $53,790 for nine months, and summer tuition was $17,800. Financial support for graduate students are provided in large part by individual departments. They include fellowships, traineeships, teaching and research assistantships, and loans. The annual increase in expenses had led to a student tradition (dating back to the 1960s) of tongue-in-cheek "tuition riots".

MIT has been nominally co-educational since admitting Ellen Swallow Richards in 1870. Richards also became the first female member of MIT's faculty, specializing in sanitary chemistry. Female students remained a small minority prior to the completion of the first wing of a women's dormitory, McCormick Hall, in 1963. Between 1993 and 2009 the proportion of women rose from 34 percent to 45 percent of undergraduates and from 20 percent to 31 percent of graduate students. , women outnumbered men in Biology, Brain & Cognitive Sciences, Architecture, Urban Planning, and Biological Engineering.

Faculty and staff 

, MIT had 1,069 faculty members. Faculty are responsible for lecturing classes, for advising both graduate and undergraduate students, and for sitting on academic committees, as well as for conducting original research. Between 1964 and 2009 a total of seventeen faculty and staff members affiliated with MIT won Nobel Prizes (thirteen of them in the latter 25 years). As of October 2020, 37 MIT faculty members, past or present, have won Nobel Prizes, the majority in Economics or Physics.

, current faculty and teaching staff included 67 Guggenheim Fellows, 6 Fulbright Scholars, and 22 MacArthur Fellows. Faculty members who have made extraordinary contributions to their research field as well as the MIT community are granted appointments as Institute Professors for the remainder of their tenures. Susan Hockfield, a molecular neurobiologist, served as MIT's president from 2004 to 2012. She was the first woman to hold the post.

MIT faculty members have often been recruited to lead other colleges and universities. Founding faculty-member Charles W. Eliot became president of Harvard University in 1869, a post he would hold for 40 years, during which he wielded considerable influence both on American higher education and on secondary education. MIT alumnus and faculty member George Ellery Hale played a central role in the development of the California Institute of Technology (Caltech), and other faculty members have been key founders of Franklin W. Olin College of Engineering in nearby Needham, Massachusetts.

 former provost Robert A. Brown served as president of Boston University; former provost Mark Wrighton is chancellor of Washington University in St. Louis; former associate provost Alice Gast is president of Lehigh University; and former professor Suh Nam-pyo is president of KAIST. Former dean of the School of Science Robert J. Birgeneau was the chancellor of the University of California, Berkeley (2004–2013); former professor John Maeda was president of Rhode Island School of Design (RISD, 2008–2013); former professor David Baltimore was president of Caltech (1997–2006); and MIT alumnus and former assistant professor Hans Mark served as chancellor of the University of Texas system (1984–1992).

In addition, faculty members have been recruited to lead governmental agencies; for example, former professor Marcia McNutt is president of the National Academy of Sciences, urban studies professor Xavier de Souza Briggs served as the associate director of the White House Office of Management and Budget, and biology professor Eric Lander was a co-chair of the President's Council of Advisors on Science and Technology. In 2013, faculty member Ernest Moniz was nominated by President Obama and later confirmed as United States Secretary of Energy. Former professor Hans Mark served as Secretary of the Air Force from 1979 to 1981. Alumna and Institute Professor Sheila Widnall served as Secretary of the Air Force between 1993 and 1997, making her the first female Secretary of the Air Force and first woman to lead an entire branch of the US military in the Department of Defense. A 1999 report, met by promises of change by President Charles Vest, found that senior female faculty in the School of Science were often marginalized, and in return for equal professional accomplishments received reduced "salary, space, awards, resources, and response to outside offers".

, MIT was the second-largest employer in the city of Cambridge. Based on feedback from employees, MIT was ranked No. 7 as a place to work, among US colleges and universities . Surveys cited a "smart", "creative", "friendly" environment, noting that the work-life balance tilts towards a "strong work ethic" but complaining about "low pay" compared to an industry position.

Notable alumni 

Many of MIT's over 120,000 alumni have achieved considerable success in scientific research, public service, education, and business. , 41 MIT alumni have won Nobel Prizes, 48 have been selected as Rhodes Scholars, 61 have been selected as Marshall Scholars, and 3 have been selected as Mitchell Scholars.

Alumni in United States politics and public service include former Chairman of the Federal Reserve Ben Bernanke, former MA-1 Representative John Olver, former CA-13 Representative Pete Stark, Representative Thomas Massie, Senator Alex Padilla, former National Economic Council chairman Lawrence H. Summers, and former Council of Economic Advisers chairman Christina Romer. MIT alumni in international politics include Foreign Affairs Minister of Iran Ali Akbar Salehi, Israeli Prime Minister Benjamin Netanyahu, President of Colombia Virgilio Barco Vargas, President of the European Central Bank Mario Draghi, former Governor of the Reserve Bank of India Raghuram Rajan, former British Foreign Minister David Miliband, former Greek Prime Minister Lucas Papademos, former UN Secretary General Kofi Annan, former Iraqi Deputy Prime Minister Ahmed Chalabi, former Minister of Education and Culture of The Republic of Indonesia Yahya Muhaimin, former Jordanian Minister of Education, Higher Education and Scientific Research and former Jordanian Minister of Energy and Mineral Resources Khaled Toukan. Alumni in sports have included Olympic fencing champion Johan Harmenberg.
MIT alumni founded or co-founded many notable companies, such as Intel, McDonnell Douglas, Texas Instruments, 3Com, Qualcomm, Bose, Raytheon, Apotex, Koch Industries, Rockwell International, Genentech, Dropbox, and Campbell Soup. According to the British newspaper The Guardian, "a survey of living MIT alumni found that they have formed 25,800 companies, employing more than three million people including about a quarter of the workforce of Silicon Valley. Those firms collectively generate global revenues of about $1.9 trillion (£1.2 trillion) a year". If the companies founded by MIT alumni were a country, they would have the 11th-highest GDP of any country in the world.

MIT alumni have led prominent institutions of higher education, including the University of California system, Harvard University, the New York Institute of Technology, Johns Hopkins University, Carnegie Mellon University, Tufts University, Rochester Institute of Technology, Rhode Island School of Design (RISD), UC Berkeley College of Environmental Design, the New Jersey Institute of Technology, Northeastern University, Tel Aviv University, Lahore University of Management Sciences, Rensselaer Polytechnic Institute, Tecnológico de Monterrey, Purdue University, Virginia Polytechnic Institute, KAIST, and Quaid-e-Azam University. Berklee College of Music, the largest independent college of contemporary music in the world, was founded and led by MIT alumnus Lawrence Berk for more than three decades.

More than one third of the United States' crewed spaceflights have included MIT-educated astronauts, a contribution exceeding that of any university excluding the United States service academies. Of the 12 people who have set foot on the Moon , four graduated from MIT (among them Apollo 11 Lunar Module Pilot Buzz Aldrin). Alumnus and former faculty member Qian Xuesen led the Chinese nuclear-weapons program and became instrumental in Chinese rocket-program.

Noted alumni in non-scientific fields include author Hugh Lofting, sculptor Daniel Chester French, guitarist Tom Scholz of the band Boston, the British BBC and ITN correspondent and political advisor David Walter, The New York Times columnist and Nobel Prize-winning economist Paul Krugman, The Bell Curve author Charles Murray, United States Supreme Court building architect Cass Gilbert,
Pritzker Prize-winning architects I.M. Pei and Gordon Bunshaft.

See also 
Massachusetts Institute of Technology School of Engineering
Whitehead Institute
 Eli and Edythe L. Broad Institute of MIT and Harvard
Koch Institute for Integrative Cancer Research
The Coop, campus bookstore

Notes

References

Sources 
 Also see the bibliography maintained by MIT's Institute Archives & Special Collections and Written Works in MIT in popular culture.

Nelkin, Dorothy. (1972). The University and Military Research: Moral politics at MIT (science, technology and society). New York: Cornell University Press. .

Postle, Denis. (1965). How to be First. BBC documentary on MIT available at reidplaza.com
Renehan, Colm. (2007). Peace Activism at the Massachusetts Institute of Technology from 1975 to 2001: A case study, PhD thesis, Boston: Boston College.

External links 

 
Universities and colleges in Cambridge, Massachusetts
Universities and colleges in Middlesex County, Massachusetts
Engineering universities and colleges in Massachusetts
Technological universities in the United States
Land-grant universities and colleges
Educational institutions established in 1861
1861 establishments in Massachusetts
Rugby league stadiums in the United States
Science and technology in Massachusetts
Private universities and colleges in Massachusetts
Glassmaking schools
Compasso d'Oro Award recipients